Blue edged sole (Soleichthys heterorhinos)  is a sole from the Eastern Indian Ocean and Western Pacific. It occasionally makes its way into the aquarium trade. It grows to a length of 18 cm.

Soleichthys heterorhinos exhibits biofluorescence, that is, when illuminated by blue or ultraviolet light, it re-emits it as red, and appears differently than under white light illumination. Biofluorescence potentially assists intraspecific communication and camouflage.

References

External links
 

Soleidae
Taxa named by Pieter Bleeker
Fish described in 1856